MTV Roadies: Hell Down Under is the sixth season of MTV Roadies, a reality television show aired on MTV India. The season 6 of roadies was also known as "Hell Down Under" because the second half of season took place in Australia and the tasks were reminiscent of Hell. The audition episodes were aired from 29 November 2008 and the journey episodes began airing on 10 January 2009. The actual journey of the selected Roadies started from 11 November 2008. Its auditions were held in various cities of India, like Ahmedabad, Kolkata, Bangalore and Chandigarh. Following mob violence during Delhi auditions, roadies from Delhi and Mumbai were shortlisted through online auditions, followed by a Group Discussion and Interview. This is the first time in MTV Roadies history that Nikhil Chinapa was replaced by Raghu's identical twin brother, Rajiv Laxman.

Roop Bhinder and Palak Johal returned as All-Stars for Roadies X - Battle for Glory. While Bhinder finished in 11th place Johal won the season.

Destination

Roadies' selection

Overall Count :

Roadies Summary

Journey

Episode 1

The first episode of the journey for the selected 20 roadies was aired on 10 January 2009. After brief introductions and partying for a while, the roadies are accosted to a place where a 'Vote-Out Stage' is set up. Rannvijay arrives and addresses them and suddenly Raghu emerges from behind Rannvijay and announces that there is going to be no vote-out. He further adds that only 10 roadies rightfully deserve to continue the journey and the remaining roadies have to prove themselves in order to continue the journey. Raghu names  Devarshi, Samrat, Paulami, Kiri, Gurmeet, Tamanna, Natasha, Pradeep, Roop and Varisha as the 'safe contestants'. The other 10 roadies are told that they will be divided into two teams and perform a task to prove themselves worthy to be on the journey.

Suzanna, Sufi, Sandeep, Bobby and Nauman make up the yellow team and Ankur, Sonia, Neha, Vicky and Bhanu form the green team. The task is to cross an obstacle course and devour as many parathas as they can in 20 minutes. The catch is that they have to perform as a team with their hand and legs tied to each other. The yellow team wins by a margin of 21 to 19. The green team members are eliminated from the show but Rannvijay announces that a vote-out will take place to eliminate a roadie from the yellow team. In the vote-out, Sufi is eliminated from the show.

Episode 2
The remaining fourteen roadies begin their journey in episode after being flagged off by previous season finalist Nihal. The journey begins for as they travel from Manesar to Pushkar on their Karizmas. Before leaving for Pushkar, they are also divided into 2 gangs, The "Blue gang" and "the Red gang". The red gang name their team "Brats" and consists of Suzanna, Bobby, Natasha, Kiri, Sandeep, Roop and Pradeep. While the Blue gang name their team "Om Blues" and consists of Paulami, Varisha, Tamanna, Devarshi, Nauman, Gurmeet and Samrat.

In a departure from previous season, they are told that they will take part in task as gangs, and thus will earn money and immunity for their respective teams or gangs. The first Money Task takes them to the Pushkar Mela where they need to collect as much cattle dung as they could.  In the Immunity task, the girls get tested on their Hindi vocabulary. While the correct answer by the girls wins some points for their respective teams, the wrong answer penalises the guys with the guys getting hit between their legs. Om Blues loses the immunity task and in the voteout there is a tie between Varisha and Paulomi. For the tiebreaker, the Brats participate in a vote out to eliminate either of Varisha and Paulami. In the resulting tiebreaker vote-out, Varisha is eliminated from the show.

Episode 3
Part 1
The episode starts with Tamanna blaming Gurmeet for Varisha's vote-out. This creates friction between both of them. Next day, the roadies are told to perform a popular classical folk-dance of Rajasthan - Kalbelia and Kachchi-Ghodi as their next money task. They are supposed to perform the dance in front of a live audience. Rannvijay informs the roadies, that in accordance with the local tradition, if the audience does not like the performance, then they will fling their shoes on the contestants to express their displeasure. The Brats win the money task again and their account is credited with Rs. 30,000 taking the total amount of their team to Rs. 80,000.

Part 2
The episode starts with the two teams receiving a scroll telling them to choose two members from their team who they wish to eliminate. The Brats choose Kiri and Suzzana while the Om Blues decide on Samrat and Paulomee. But at the site of immunity task when Rannvijay asks the Om Blues, Palak nominates Dev and Tamanna. The task is a tight rope race in a Best-of-3 contest. Dev and Tamanna win the task and they get to choose two members from their team who will be voted against in the vote-out in addition to Kiri and Suzzana. At the vote-out Tamanna and Dev choose Palak and Samrat and in the vote-out Palak is eliminated. As the Om Blues were left with just five members and the Brats had seven, so to even it out one member of the Brats had to switch to the Om Blues. In the resulting vote Bobby, Kiri and Suzzana each get three votes and finally Om Blues choose Kiri to join them.

Episode 4
In this episode the roadies head towards Mount Abu. Here, the roadies are provided with a sumptuous meal and soon after their lunch, Rannvijay emerges to announce that this is going to be their next money task. He asks each gang to select 4 roadies from their teams who will be fed laxative tablets. The task is to see which team can hold out the longest without relieving themselves. For each hour they hold out, their team gets Rs. 25,000. Brats selected Pradeep, Roop, Natasha and Bobby, whereas Om Blues select all the four boys among them, i.e. Samrat, Nauman, Kiri and Devarshi. After holding out for two hours, Bobby rushes to the loo and thus Om Blues win their first money task.

The Immunity task of the episode was "Pot Balancing Race", for which each gang is asked to select "the least deserving roadie among them". In this task, the participants have to balance 3 earthen pots on their head in race to the finish line. Brats picks Bobby and Om Blues selects Paulami for the task. Paulami defeats Bobby in both the races and is declared a winner. However, as a twist to the tale, Paulami and all members of Brats (except Bobby) get immunity. In the vote out, Nauman is eliminated.

Episode 5
Part 1
The episode starts with the roadies heading towards Gandhinagar. On their way to Gandhinagar, Bobby meets with an accident and gets injured. As they reach Gandhinagar, the roadies are told that they have to camp and live in tents. The roadies are then taken to a poolside where they are told that they notice a pool table immersed in a swimming pool. Rannvijay announces that for their next money task they have to play pool while holding their breath inside the water. Bobby backs out of the task due to her injuries. Om Blues win this task and pocket Rs. 70,000 in this task, taking their total earnings to Rs.120,000.

At night, the roadies have a surprise Q & A session in which each roadie gets to ask another roadie an anonymous question. This session builds up more friction and animosity amongst the roadies. Next morning, the roadies leave for Varsoda which is the location of their next immunity task. Here, they are taken to a palace which is allegedly haunted. Both the gangs are asked to explore the place where to their surprise they find Raghu and Rajeev sitting in two separate rooms as they enter.

Part 2
The twins assign the teams their new immunity task, that of selecting one member from their respective teams to be shut inside a casket, the catch being that the person who is shut inside the casket is immediately eliminated while his remaining gang members attain immunity. The gang which does this task fastest attains immunity. Devarshi of "Om blues" volunteers to enter the casket without any opposition from his teammates, while the Brats bully and force Bobby to enter the casket citing her injury. A very reluctant Bobby initially refuses, but finally gives in and enters the casket. The rest of the roadies of Om Blues are relieved that they don't have to enter the casket, and they come out of the room immediately, and thus winning the immunity.

Raghu and Rajiv (cousin), surprised by the Devarshi's willingness to be eliminated, give him a severe tongue-lashing for being so stupid, and send him off the show. However Raghu, reprimands the "Brats" for bullying Bobby into getting into the casket and in a twist to the tale award her with immunity. They also give her the power to choose two people from her gang who will get to be immune from the vote-out along with her. Bobby chooses Sandeep and Pradeep to be immune from vote-out. In the vote-out, Roop is eliminated. This was a shock since Roop was supposed to be the mastermind. It turned out that Samrat along with Suzzana and Natasha has masterminded Roop's vote out.

Episode 6
After Roop's vote-out, roadies travel to Silvassa. Here, they are taken to a tribal hamlet where Rannvijay and Raghu greet the roadies. After a traditional tribal dance performance, Raghu announces that from this point onwards each roadie is independent and the gangs would cease to exist. For their immunity task, the Roadies are asked to wrestle in a traditional wrestling ring (Akhara). There would be two bouts, one for girls and the second for guys. To eliminate an opponent, one would have to push them out of the ring, and the last man standing would be the winner. Raghu also announces that the boy and the girl who win the immunity task will also get a chance to win Rs 2lac cash which the "Gangs" had accumulated so far.

Next day Raghu announces that there will be a contest between Samrat and Natasha to decide on who gets the Rs 2 Lac cash. However, Raghu introduces a twist by announcing that though the winner of this task may win the Prize money but he/she will have to forego the immunity. The task is an Archery task where the participants have to shoot at a rotating target. Neither Natasha or Samrat are able to hit the target, wherein Raghu gives other Roadies a go at the target. The other Roadies too fail to hit the target and hence the prize money in the "roadies account" is reset to zero. The Roadies then proceed for the vote-out where, Suzanna gets voted-out with a margin of 5-3 against Sandeep.

Episode 7
Roadies In Australia

The Australian journey begins from Adelaide. Rannvijay then reveals that 3 roadies who had been evicted earlier will get a chance to replace 3 existings by charging them to a task and winning it. The three wildcard Roadies are revealed to be Nauman, Palak and Sufi. They challenge Pradeep Nauman wins, thereby eliminating Pradeep. Palak defeats Bobby in a Mechanical bull riding task, thereby eliminating her. Thus, all three "wildcard entry" roadies manage to replace three existing roadies.
Rannvijay then announces that there would be a voteout which the winners of the tasks, Palak, Nauman and Sufi would be immune. The roadies vote out Sandeep, whose influence was considerably weakened after his friends Pradeep and Bobby were eliminated.

Episode 8
The roadies reach the Menindin, Broken Hill, Australia. They had to reach a river and do the Advantage task which made the winners Nauman, Samrat and Natasha immune and also gave them the chance to win Hero Honda Karizma bike. Then they are made to reach in the middle of nowhere, at the outback of Australia. There Nauman and Natasha backed out of the Wrestling task and lost their immunity and chance to win the bike. Instead Gurmeet (Palak) and Sufi take their challenge and win the bike. Sufi got injured in his left leg while fighting the two Australian wrestlers and had to walk with a stick for the rest of the Australian episodes. Out of 5 bikes 3 bikes were won in this episode by Samrat, Sufi and Palak. Tamanna was voted-out in this episode.

Episode 9
Roadies reach their next destination Dubbo. The Roadies face the first money task of their journey of Australia of having a match individually with professional rugby players of the Dubbo Rhino rugby team with the team blindfolded and a bell tied on the feet of the Roadies. The roadies win 1,85,000 rupees in that task. Then the second task of the episode was the immunity task in which Roadies had to face crocodiles and collect as many chips as possible to win immunity. Sufi wins the immunity. Samrat was voted-out after a hot debate between Sufi and Gurmeet.

Episode 10
The Roadies go on their Karizmas to Gold Coast, Queensland. There they face the money task where they have to dive from the diving board on to the pool splashing as much water on the models as they can. When the models' shirts get wet, the shirts become transparent. There are two letters on each of the three models' stomach and out of those letters, they have to come up with as many words as possible. The roadies win 37,000 rupees in this money task.

The roadies get an envelope  saying "open at your own risk". Inside that envelope  it said that "you will experience hell in your next vote out". The next day, the roadies go to a theme park for their immunity task. The task is that they have to complete is drink a milkshake and ride in the Claw, an intense ride, as many times as they can without throwing up. Nauman wins the task and gets the immunity. At the vote out, everyone votes Gurmeet out. It turns out that the hell that the roadies would experience is that the person who gets voted out, will actually be safe and that person could choose anyone who they want to get eliminated. Gurmeet eliminates Sufi.

Episode 11
Roadies reach their next destination Coffs Harbour. For their money task roadies have to save goals in ice hockey. The roadies win 1,40,000 rupees in this money task. This was the last money task of the season and the total prize money was declared to be INR 3,62,000.

The roadies then have to collect flags when chased by cowboys in horses with lassos. This is their immunity task. They have to stop collecting if the lasso falls on them. Nauman collects 7 flags. Palak & Paulami collect 5 each. Natasha collects 6. So Nauman wins the immunity.

At vote out these is a tie between Palak & Paulami. So cards are shuffled by a professional & roadies select their vote again. This time Natasha gets 2 votes, so she is voted out.
Finally, Nauman, Palak and Paulami are top 3 roadies who make it to final destination of Australia: Sydney

Episode 12
The Roadies had reached Sydney, their final destination. They got A$50 and were asked to buy whatever they wanted. They also visited the famous Bondi beach in Sydney where they saw hot girls and cool guys. All the three spent their day by hanging out.

Next they had to face a Hot air balloon for Advantage task (this task is considered the best task of this season by crew and audience). They had to just cross a bridge connecting 2 balloons which was 100 ft above ground level. Paulomi became the captain  and decided to go 1st, followed by Palak and Nauman. Paulomi completed this task in 1 minute and 19 seconds. Palak did it in 22 seconds. Nauman did it in 10 seconds, thus winning the task and the advantage. The next day, Rannvijay told Nauman that he had the advantage of choosing his co-finalist-either Palak or Paulami. He chose Palak. But Rannvijay told him that there's gonna be a task to be conducted between the 2 girls. Palak wins. Raghu also surprised them by telling them that the final showdown will take place in India.

Episode 13
The roadies re-entered India for the first part of the two part grand finale. The grand finale took place in "karjat" in Mumbai, India. There they received a surprise visit from the ex-roadies but the roadies who were evicted in the first episode were not present. Raghu decides to let 3 ex roadies to come back in the show and have a competition. Whoever won  the competition  would compete with Nauman and Palak in the Grand finale. Raghu lets Natasha and Sufi to be two of those three roadies since they were eliminated because of one of his twists. There was a vote in to see who would be the third roadie. Kiri wins the vote in with 6 votes. The task was to walk on a very narrow path in complete darkness with strobe lights flashing in  their face. Kiri won the task and will compete with Nauman and Palak in the Grand finale. So the 3 finalists of MTV Roadies Hell Down Under are : Nauman, Palak, Kiri.

Episode 14
The final episode of roadies hell down under. The pressure was immense. Nauman, Palak & Kiri had to perform rock climbing task which was a pre-final task. And the winner was given the power to take one of the other two losers. He had to cut the rope of one that he didn't want to take with him for grand finale. Kiri was way ahead of Nauman & Palak in the task. He reached the top first.

Raghu & Rajiv were standing there. They congratulated and asked Kiri which Roadie would he choose. He chose the weaker contender of the two, Palak and so Raghu got angry. Kiri said that he can beat anyone, and so Raghu said that if he can beat anyone, why doesn't he choose the stronger contender defeat him and win with respect? He had proved himself and reached the top so he should be confident enough to beat anyone in finale. But Rajiv was giving him a different option. He was saying he should easily win by choosing the weaker of two. Finally Kiri decided to win the respect & chose Nauman as his opponent for the Grand Finale & axed Palak's rope. Kiri could have won had he decided to go with Palak. But Raghu forced him to go with Nauman and subsequently he lost.

The final task took place near a lake. All the Roadies were there. It was going to finally end. The winner was going to be declared. Ranvijay encouraged them and gave an emotional speech. Then, both Nauman and Kiri got bound by chains on their hands, legs and neck. They were tied to a chain which was connected to a pan carrying heavy weights. To win, they had to pull the rope connected to the pan and use their strength and speed to walk 20 steps and pull out the Roadies flag.  The race started. They both ran at first but were suddenly stopped by the force of the weight and nearly fell down. All the Roadies (except Sufi, Tamanna, Devarshi and Varisha) were cheering for Kiri.  Kiri was in lead. Nauman was far behind. He even fell two times and his feet started bleeding very badly. But then he got up and used all his strength, went on and eventually won. Nauman became the Ultimate Roadie. Kiri and Nauman were called back and both got a Hero Honda Karizma bike. Nauman, being the winner of the season, also won the prize money - Rs. 3,52,000

Voting History 

 Gang Om Blues
 Gang Brats

 Indicates the contestant was immune that week.
 Indicates the contestant was eliminated that week.
 Indicates the contestant wild card entry in the competition.
 Indicates the contestant was eliminated outside vote out that week.
 Indicates the contestant is the runner up.
 Indicates the contestant won the competition.

Roadies History
 Key
  – The Contestant won the Competition
  – Contestant eliminated as a result of losing a task against an opponent
  – Contestant returned as a wild card entry
  – Contestant was voted out of the competition by other roadies
  – Contestant returned as a wild card entry but could not qualify for a place

 = Indicates that the Roadie was present in the episode.

 = Indicates that the Roadie was absent in the episode

 = Indicates that the roadies was present in the episode but as a part of the audience for watching the Finale rather than as a contestant for the title.

'''

External links
 Roadies Official Website
 Rodies Official Blog, Photos and Profiles
 Roadies 8 audition form

MTV Roadies
2008 Indian television seasons
2009 Indian television seasons